The minor league Providence Grays was the name of several minor league baseball teams between  and . These teams were unconnected to the Major League Baseball Providence Grays.

The first minor league Grays were members of the Eastern League in 1886, playing at the Messer Street Grounds. The team folded in June. 

The Grays and Clamdiggers had been preceded in Providence by the Providence Rhode Islanders who played as members of the 1877 New England Association.

That team remained in operation through , at which point the EL had become the International League. Babe Ruth played for this version of the Grays in 1914.

This team lasted until .

References

Defunct Eastern League (1938–present) teams
Sports in Providence, Rhode Island
Professional baseball teams in Rhode Island
Defunct baseball teams in Rhode Island
New England League teams
Baseball teams disestablished in 1949
Baseball teams established in 1886